Jo Hall (born 25 June 1958) is a former Australian retired television presenter.

Hall currently presents Nine News Regional Victoria and is a reporter for Nine News.

Career
Hall began her career with a Melbourne newspaper cadetship, then joined Nine News in 1979. In 1990 she became the first woman to be presented with the Thorn Award, a national award for journalism.

She presented Nine News Melbourne on weekends for 13 years and has filled in for Peter Hitchener. Hall also presented national Nine News late news update on weekends. She also works with the Variety Club on McHappy Day and is a patron of Bonnie Babes, a research organisation.

In November 2011, it was announced that Hall wanted to scale back her role, with Alicia Loxley replacing her as weekend news presenter. Hall now presents weekday news updates and is a fill-in presenter.

In November 2016, it was announced Hall would host four new Nine News Victoria regional bulletins - Nine News Western Victoria, Nine News Central Victoria, Nine News Border North East and Nine News Gippsland - from Nine's Melbourne studios but featuring news, sport and weather reports from reporters in Ballarat, Bendigo, Albury-Wodonga, Shepparton and Traralgon.

In February 2017, Hall joined 3AW to host an hour-long chat program, Great Australian Lives.

Personal life
She attended Koonung High School Box Hill North.

Hall has four children with her former husband, Jason Danda.

References

External links 
Profile of Jo Hall at NineMSN

Nine News presenters
Australian television journalists
Living people
1958 births
Television personalities from Melbourne